Cristian Salvato (born 18 August 1971, in Campo San Martino) is a former Italian racing cyclist.

Major results
1989
1st  Junior World Team Time Trial Championships (with Davide Rebellin, Rossano Brasi and Andrea Peron)
1991
1st Mediterranean Games Team Time Trial (with Flavio Anastasia, Luca Colombo and Gianfranco Contri)
1993
1st  UCI World Team Time Trial Championships (with Gianfranco Contri, Rosario Fina and Rossano Brasi)
1st Mediterranean Games Team Time Trial (with Gianfranco Contri, Luca Colombo and Francesco Rossano)
1994
1st  UCI World Team Time Trial Championships (with Gianfranco Contri, Luca Colombo and Dario Andriotto)
1st Duo Normand (with Gianfranco Contri)
1997
3rd National Time Trial Championships

References

1971 births
Living people
Italian male cyclists
Competitors at the 1991 Mediterranean Games
Competitors at the 1993 Mediterranean Games
Mediterranean Games competitors for Italy
Cyclists from the Province of Padua